Three ships of the United States Navy have been named Cook 
 , was launched on 26 August 1944. Named after two brothers: Andrew F. Cook, Jr. and Dallas H. Cook. 
 , was launched on 23 January 1971. Named after Lieutenant Commander Wilmer Cook, USN.

The third ship, currently in commission, is named after Donald Cook, a Vietnam War POW:
 , launched on 3 May 1997.

Sources

United States Navy ship names